Michael Harold Schuler (September 22, 1940 – June 28, 2022) was an American basketball coach in both college and the National Basketball Association (NBA).  He was the head coach of the Portland Trail Blazers and Los Angeles Clippers from 1986 to 1992 and compiled a win–loss record of 179–159.  He won the NBA Coach of the Year Award in 1987, becoming the second rookie coach to be conferred the honor.

Early life
Schuler was born in Portsmouth, Ohio, on September 22, 1940.  He attended Portsmouth High School in his hometown.  He was then awarded a NCAA Division I scholarship to study at Ohio University, where he played for the Ohio Bobcats and won two Mid-American Conference championships with the team.  He graduated in 1962.

Coaching career

College
Schuler started his coaching career in 1965, working as an assistant for the Army Black Knights.  He then went back to Ohio, his alma mater, and was an assistant coach there for three seasons.  He subsequently joined the Virginia Military Institute as its head coach in 1969.  During his three seasons with the Keydets, the team recorded a .171 winning percentage (13–63).  After a four-season stint as an assistant at the University of Virginia, Schuler became head coach of the Rice Owls in 1977.  He served in that capacity until 1981, compiling a .283 winning percentage (30–76) during his tenure there.

Professional
Schuler garnered his first professional coaching position in 1981 as an assistant of the New Jersey Nets.  He worked in that role for two seasons, before becoming an assistant coach of the Milwaukee Bucks from 1983 to 1986.  He was subsequently hired as head coach of the Portland Trail Blazers.  One incident he was remembered for occurred at the first press conference that introduced him as the coach of the Trail Blazers, when he fell out of his chair.  The footage was seen often on American television in the following days, and Schuler termed it "my instant claim to fame".

During his first season as coach of the Blazers, Schuler led the franchise to a 49–33 record.  He was first named NBA Coach of the Month in February 1987, before winning the NBA Coach of the Year Award later that year.  He was the second rookie coach to receive the latter award, and one of only five to achieve the feat at the time of his death.  He followed that up with a 53–29 campaign, though the season ended in a first-round playoff defeat.  In his third season with the Blazers, the team was racked with dissension and posted a 25–22 record before Schuler was fired in mid-February.  He recorded a .602 winning percentage (127–84) with the Trail Blazers.  Then-assistant coach Rick Adelman was promoted to replace him on an interim basis.  After the Blazers reached the 1989 NBA Playoffs and were swept in the first round by the Lakers, Adelman was made the head coach on a permanent basis.

Schuler served as assistant coach of the Golden State Warriors for the 1989–90 season, before becoming coach of the Los Angeles Clippers the following year.  He served in that role until he was dismissed halfway through the 1991–92 season, compiling a .409 winning percentage (52–75) during his time with the Clippers.  He went on to serve as an assistant coach for the Sacramento Kings from 1992 to 1994, and for the Minnesota Timberwolves from 1994 to 1997.  He later returned to the Bucks as an assistant in 2003, before retiring at the end of the 2004–05 season.

Personal life
Schuler married Gloria Sissea in July 1963.  They remained married for 53 years until her death in 2016.  Together, they had two daughters: Kimberly and Kristin.

Schuler died on June 28, 2022, at the age of 81.

Head coaching record

|- 
| align="left" |Portland
| align="left" |
|82||49||33||.598|| align="center" |2nd in Pacific||4||1||3||.250
| align="center" |Lost in First Round
|- 
| align="left" |Portland
| align="left" |
|82||53||29||.646|| align="center" |2nd in Pacific||4||1||3||.250
| align="center" |Lost in First Round
|- 
| align="left" |Portland
| align="left" |
|47||25||22||.532|| align="center" |(fired)||—||—||—||—
| align="center" |—
|- 
| align="left" |L.A. Clippers
| align="left" |
|82||31||51||.378|| align="center" |6th in Pacific||—||—||—||—
| align="center" |Missed Playoffs
|- 
| align="left" |L.A. Clippers
| align="left" |
|45||21||24||.467|| align="center" |(fired)||—||—||—||—
| align="center" |—
|- 
|-class="sortbottom"
| align="left" |Career
| ||338||179||159||.530|| ||8||2||6||.250
|- class="sortbottom"
| colspan="12" style="text-align: center;" | Source:

References

1940 births
2022 deaths
American men's basketball coaches
American men's basketball players
Army Black Knights men's basketball coaches
Basketball coaches from Ohio
Basketball players from Ohio
Golden State Warriors assistant coaches
Los Angeles Clippers head coaches
Milwaukee Bucks assistant coaches
Minnesota Timberwolves assistant coaches
New Jersey Nets assistant coaches
Ohio Bobcats men's basketball coaches
Ohio Bobcats men's basketball players
People from Portsmouth, Ohio
Portland Trail Blazers head coaches
Rice Owls men's basketball coaches
Sacramento Kings assistant coaches
Virginia Cavaliers men's basketball coaches
VMI Keydets basketball coaches